Piezoelectric bone surgery is a process that utilizes piezoelectric vibrations in the application of cutting bone tissue. The process was patented by Fernando Bianchetti, Domenico Vercellotti, and Tomaso Vercellotti. It was first used clinically in 1988. It is indicated for use in oral, maxillofacial, cranial and spinal procedures; but is mainly used in orthodontics and craniofacial surgery.

By adjusting the ultrasonic frequency of the device, it is possible to cut hard tissue while leaving soft tissue untouched by the process. The ultrasonic frequency is modulated from 10, 30, and 60 cycles/s (Hz) to 29 kHz. The low frequency enables cutting of mineralized structures, not soft tissue. Power can be adjusted from 2.8 to 16 W, with preset power settings for various types of bone density. The tip vibrates within a range of 60–200 µm, which allows clean cutting with precise incisions. Recent articles on the topic of piezoelectricity have named piezoelectric surgery as one of the most important applications of this concept, in addition to medical ultrasound imaging. Recently, the Malhotra laboratory at Penn Neurosurgery has published additional work on this procedure for rare cancers of the spinal column.

See also
 Surgery
 Piezomagnetism
 Piezoelectricity

References

External links
 

Detchou DK, Dimentberg R, Vaughan KA, Kolster R, Braslow BM, Malhotra NR. Navigated Ultrasonic Osteotomy to Aid in En Bloc Chordoma Resection via Spondylectomy. World Neurosurg. 2020 Nov;143:319-324. doi: 10.1016/j.wneu.2020.08.021. Epub 2020 Aug 10. PMID: 32791231.

Detchou DK, Glauser G, Dimentberg R, Schuster JM, Malhotra NR. Case Series of Ultrasonic Navigated Osteotomy for the Treatment of Spinal Chordomas. World Neurosurg. 2021 Mar 8:S1878-8750(21)00367-3. doi: 10.1016/j.wneu.2021.03.001. Epub ahead of print. PMID: 33706017.

Orthopedic surgical procedures